Under Offer is a property game show that aired in the Meridian region from 14 April 1998 to 17 June 2001 and ran for 4 series. It was hosted by Yvette Fielding and team captained by Fred Dinenage and Toyah Willcox.

Transmissions

External links
.

1998 British television series debuts
2001 British television series endings
1990s British game shows
2000s British game shows
ITV game shows
Television series by ITV Studios